STS-107 was the 113th flight of the Space Shuttle program, and the 28th flight of Space Shuttle Columbia. The mission ended, on February 1, 2003, with the Space Shuttle Columbia disaster which killed all seven crew members and destroyed the space shuttle. It was the 88th post-Challenger disaster mission.

The flight launched from Kennedy Space Center in Florida on January 16, 2003. It spent 15 days, 22 hours, 20 minutes, 32 seconds in orbit. The crew conducted a multitude of international scientific experiments. The disaster occurred during reentry while the Columbia was over Texas.

Immediately after the disaster, NASA convened the Columbia accident Investigation Board to determine the cause of the disintegration. The source of the failure was determined to have been caused by a piece of foam that broke off during launch and damaged the thermal protection system (reinforced carbon-carbon panels and thermal protection tiles) on the leading edge of the orbiter's left wing. During re-entry the damaged wing slowly overheated and came apart, eventually leading to loss of control and disintegration of the vehicle. The cockpit window frame is now exhibited in a memorial inside the Space Shuttle Atlantis Pavilion at the Kennedy Space Center.

The damage to the thermal protection system on the wing was similar to that Atlantis had sustained in 1988 during STS-27, the second mission after the Space Shuttle Challenger disaster.  However, the damage on STS-27 occurred at a spot that had more robust metal (a thin steel plate near the landing gear), and that mission survived the re-entry.

Mission highlights

STS-107 carried the SPACEHAB Double Research Module on its inaugural flight, the Freestar experiment (mounted on a Hitchhiker Program rack), and the Extended Duration Orbiter pallet. SPACEHAB was first flown on STS-57.

One of the experiments, a video taken to study atmospheric dust, may have detected a new atmospheric phenomenon, dubbed a "TIGER" (Transient Ionospheric Glow Emission in Red).

On board Columbia was a copy of a drawing by Petr Ginz, the editor-in-chief of the magazine Vedem, who depicted what he imagined the Earth looked like from the Moon when he was a 14-year-old prisoner in the Terezín concentration camp. The copy was in the possession of Ilan Ramon and was lost in the disintegration. Ramon also traveled with a dollar bill received from the Lubavitcher Rebbe.

An Australian experiment, created by students from Glen Waverley Secondary College, was designed to test the reaction of zero gravity on the web formation of the Australian garden orb weaver spider.

Major experiments
Examples of some of the experiments and investigations on the mission.

In SPACEHAB RDM:
9 commercial payloads with 21 investigations, 
4 payloads for the European Space Agency with 14 investigations
1 payload for ISS Risk Mitigation 
18 payloads NASA's Office of Biological and Physical Research (OBPR) with 23 investigations

In the payload bay attached to RDM:
Combined Two-Phase Loop Experiment (COM2PLEX), 
Miniature Satellite Threat Reporting System (MSTRS) 
Star Navigation (STARNAV).

FREESTAR
Critical Viscosity of Xenon- 2 (CVX-2)
Low Power Transceiver (LPT)
Mediterranean Israeli Dust Experiment (MEIDEX)
 Space Experiment Module (SEM- 14)
Solar Constant Experiment-3 (SOLCON-3) 
Shuttle Ozone Limb Sounding Experiment (SOLSE-2)

Additional payloads
Shuttle Ionospheric Modification with Pulsed Local Exhaust Experiment (SIMPLEX) 
Ram Burn Observation (RAMBO).

Because much of the data was transmitted during the mission, there was still large return on the mission objectives even though Columbia was lost on re-entry. NASA estimated that 30% of the total science data was saved and collected through telemetry back to ground stations. Around 5-10% more data was saved and collected through recovering samples and hard drives intact on the ground after the Space Shuttle Columbia disaster, increasing the total data of saved experiments despite the disaster from 30% to 35-40%.  

About 5-6 Columbia payloads encompassing many experiments were successfully recovered in the debris field. Scientists and engineers were able to recover 99% of the data for one of the six FREESTAR experiments, Critical Viscosity of Xenon-2 (CVX-2), that flew unpressurized in the payload bay during the mission after recovering the viscometer and hard drive damaged but fully intact in the debris field in Texas. NASA recovered a commercial payload, Commercial Instrumentation Technology Associates (ITA) Biomedical Experiments-2 (CIBX-2), and ITA was able to increase the total data saved from STS-107 from 0% to 50% for this payload. This experiment studied treatments for cancer, and the micro-encapsulation experiment part of the payload was completely recovered, increasing from 0% data to 90% data after recovering the samples fully intact for this experiment. In this same payload were numerous crystal-forming experiments by hundreds of elementary and middle school students from all across the United States. Miraculously most of their experiments were found intact in CIBX-2, increasing from 0% data to 100% fully recovered data. The BRIC-14 (moss growth experiment) and BRIC-60 (Caenorhabditis elegans ringworm experiment) samples were found intact in the debris field within a  radius in east Texas. 80-87% of these live organisms survived the catastrophe. The moss and ringworms experiments' original primary mission was not nominal due to the lack of having the samples immediately after landing in its original state (they were discovered many months after the crash), but these samples helped the scientific community greatly in the field of astrobiology and helped form new theories about microorganisms surviving a long trip in outer space while traveling on meteorites or asteroids.

Re-entry

Columbia began re-entry as planned, but the heat shield was compromised due to damage sustained during the initial ascent. The heat of re-entry was free to spread into the damaged portion of the orbiter, ultimately causing its disintegration and the loss of all hands.

The accident triggered a 7-month investigation and a search for debris, and over 85,000 pieces were collected over the course of the initial investigation. This amounted to roughly 38 percent of the orbiter vehicle.

Crew

Insignia

The mission insignia itself is the only patch of the shuttle program that is entirely shaped in the orbiter's outline. The central element of the patch is the microgravity symbol, µg, flowing into the rays of the astronaut symbol.

The mission inclination is portrayed by the 39-degree angle of the astronaut symbol to the Earth's horizon. The sunrise is representative of the numerous experiments that are the dawn of a new era for continued microgravity research on the International Space Station and beyond. The breadth of science and the exploration of space is illustrated by the Earth and stars. The constellation Columba (the dove) was chosen to symbolize peace on Earth and the Space Shuttle Columbia. The seven stars also represent the mission crew members and honor the original astronauts who paved the way to make research in space possible. Six stars have five points, the seventh has six points like a Star of David, symbolizing the Israeli Space Agency's contributions to the mission.

An Israeli flag is adjacent to the name of Payload Specialist Ramon, who was the first Israeli in space. The crew insignia or 'patch' design was initiated by crew members Dr. Laurel Clark and Dr. Kalpana Chawla. First-time crew member Clark provided most of the design concepts as Chawla led the design of her maiden voyage STS-87 insignia. Clark also pointed out that the dove in the Columba constellation was mythologically connected to the explorers the Argonauts who released the dove.

Gallery

See also

List of Space Shuttle missions
Outline of space science

References

Literature

External links

NASA's Space Shuttle Columbia and Her Crew
NASA STS-107 Crew Memorial web page
NASA's STS-107 Space Research Web Site
Spaceflight Now: STS-107 Mission Report

Press Kit
Article describing experiments which survived the disaster
Article: Astronaut Laurel Clark from Racine, WI
Status reports Detailed NASA status reports for each day of the mission.

Space accidents and incidents in the United States
Space Shuttle Columbia disaster
Space Shuttle missions
Space program fatalities
Spacecraft launched in 2003
Articles containing video clips
February 2003 events
2003 in Texas
January 2003 events
2003 in Louisiana
Kalpana Chawla